Ash-Shams ("The Sun") is the 91st surah of the Qur'an, with 15 ayat or verses. It opens with a series of solemn oaths sworn on various astronomical phenomena, the first of which, "by the sun", gives the sura its name, then on the human soul itself. It then describes the fate of Thamud, a formerly prosperous but now extinct Arab tribe. The prophet Saleh urged them to worship God alone, and commanded them in God's name to preserve a certain she-camel; they disobeyed and continued to reject his message; they killed the she-camel and God destroyed them all except those who had followed Salih.

Summary
1-10 Oaths that man’s happiness and misery depends on the purity or corruption he hath wrought in it
11-15 Thamúd destroyed for rejecting their prophet

Name of the surah
Jalaluddin Al-Suyuti co-author of the classical Sunni tafsīr known as Tafsir al-Jalalayn suggests that some of the sūrahs have been named using incipits (i.e. the first few words of the surah). The Surah has been so designated after the word ash-shams with which it opens. Hamiduddin Farahi a celebrated Islamic scholar of Indian subcontinent is known for his groundbreaking work on the concept of Nazm, or Coherence, in the Quran. He writes that some sūrahs have been given names after some conspicuous words used in them. Touched by an Angel: Tafseer Juz ‘Amma is an AlMaghrib Institute Tafsir course which further investigates that the sun (ash-shams) is mentioned in several surahs; the reason why is this one called Surah Shams is because, in it, the sun is mentioned four times. Allah says:
91:1 وَالشَّمْسِ وَضُحَاهَا
92:2 وَالْقَمَرِ إِذَا تَلَاهَا
92:3 وَالنَّهَارِ إِذَا جَلَّاهَا
92:4 وَاللَّيْلِ إِذَا يَغْشَاهَا

Translation: By the sun and its brightness, and [by] the moon when it follows it. And [by] the day when it displays it, and [by] the night when it covers it. [Surah Ash-Shams, verses 1-4]. Notice “it,” “it,” “it,” … in Arabic, the pronoun used is haa (هَا), which is feminine. And all the other nouns referred to are masculine; which only leaves Ash-Shams–the sun–which is a feminine word; that’s the “it” referred to in the first four ayaat.

Period of revelation
Sūrat ash-Shams is a Meccan surah. Meccan suras are chronologically earlier surahs that were revealed to Muhammad at Mecca before the hijrah to Medina in 622 CE. They are typically shorter, with relatively short ayat, and mostly come near the end of the Qur'an’s 114 surahs. Most of the surahs containing muqattaʿat are Meccan. In his book The Corân, William Muir classifies ash-Shams in a Quranic sub-category known as the Soliloquies - a literary form of discourse in which Muhammad talks to himself or reveals his thoughts without addressing a listener. However, Sale argues that this sūrah seems to be ruled out of that category by the change in style of āyāt.

Theme and subject matter

In view of the subject matter this Surah consists of two parts. The first part consists of vv. 1-10, and the second of vv. 11-15.

According to an account from the book A Comprehensive Commentary on the Quran, translated by George Sale, Principal Subjects of verses 1-10 is "Oaths that man’s happiness and misery depends on the purity or corruption he hath wrought in it" and "Thamúd destroyed for rejecting their prophet" in verses 11-15.

Sayyid Qutb (d. 1966), who was an Egyptian author, Islamist of the Muslim Brotherhood in Egypt and was seen as a controversial intellectual due to his justification of violence against civilians, surmised the overall theme of Surat Al-Lail in the introduction to his extensive Quranic commentary, Fi Zilal al-Quran by saying:

Javed Ahmad Ghamidi (b. 1951), a well-known Pakistani Muslim theologian, Quran scholar and exegete, and educationist, surmised the overall theme of Surah Shams as The leaders of the Quraysh have been warned, on the basis of the law of retribution, about their rebellious and arrogant attitude towards the Prophetic mission.
And his analysis of subject says:

The Theme of Surah ash-Shams presented in Malik Al-Qur'an Translation coincides with Javed Ahmad Ghamidi's theme and overlaps with thematic analysis of Sayyid Maududi which says:

And that its theme is to distinguish the good from the evil and to warn the people, who were refusing to understand this distinction and insisting on following the evil way, of the evil end. However Malik argues that Major Issue, Divine Law and Guidance in this surah is that "Success depends on keeping the soul pure and failure depends on corrupting it, people of Thamud were leveled to the ground for that very reason."

1-10 Good and evil

The first part deals with three things:-:

1-That just as the sun and the moon, the day and the night, the earth and the sky, are different from each other and contradictory in their effects and results, so are the good and the evil different front each other and contradictory in their effects and results; they are neither alike in their outward appearance nor can they be alike in their results.

2-That God after giving the human self powers of the body, sense and mind has not left it uninformed in the world, but has instilled into his unconscious by means of a natural inspiration the distinction between good and evil, right and wrong, and the sense of the good to be good and of the evil to be evil.

3-That the future of man depends on how by using the powers of discrimination, will and judgement that Allah has endowed him with, he develops the good and suppresses the evil tendencies of the self. If he develops the good inclination and frees his self of the evil inclinations, he will attain to eternal success, and if, on the contrary, he suppresses the good and promotes the evil, he will meet with disappointment and failure.
Sahl al-Tustari (d. 896), a Sufi and scholar of the Qur'an, mentions, "By the day when it reveals her [the sun],He said:This means: the light of faith removes the darkness of ignorance and extinguishes the flames of the Fire.

11-15 Historical precedent of the people of Thamud 

In the second part citing the historical precedent of the people of Thamud the significance of prophethood has been brought out. A messenger is raised in the world, because the inspirational knowledge of good and evil that Allah has placed in human nature, is by itself not enough for the guidance of man, but on account of his failure to understand it fully man has been proposing wrong criteria and theories of good and evil and thus going astray. That is why Allah sent down clear and definite revelation to the prophets to augment man's natural inspiration so that they may expound to the people as to what is good and what is evil. Likewise, the prophet Saleh was sent to the people of Thamud, but the people overwhelmed by the evil of their self, had become so rebellious that they rejected him. And when he presented before them the miracle of the She-Camel of God, as demanded by themselves, the most wretched one of them, in spite of his warning, hamstrung it, in accordance with the will and desire of the people. Consequently, the entire tribe was overtaken by a disaster.

Asbāb al-nuzūl
Asbāb al-nuzūl (occasions or circumstances of revelation) is a secondary genre of Qur'anic exegesis (tafsir) directed at establishing the context in which specific verses of the Qur'an were revealed. Though of some use in reconstructing the Qur'an's historicity, asbāb is by nature an exegetical rather than a historiographical genre, and as such usually associates the verses it explicates with general situations rather than specific events. Most of the mufassirūn say that this surah was revealed at Mecca, at a stage when opposition to Muhammad had grown very strong and intense.

Special traits of Sūrat ash-Shams
Muhammad is reported to have said that the reward of reciting this surah is compared to the things upon which the sun and the moon shine. The Shi'i Imam Ja'far al-Sadiq (d. 748) said that the person who recites the surah ash-Shams, al-Lail, adh-Dhuha and al-Inshirah will, on the Day of Judgement, find all creatures of the earth testifying on his behalf and Allah will accept their testimony and give him a place in Jannah (Paradise).

Ahadith about Surah ash-Shams
`Abd Allah ibn `Umar (c. 614 – 693) narrated that while Muhammad was passing by Thamud's houses on his way to the Battle of Tabouk, he stopped together with the people there. The people fetched water from the wells from which the people of Thamud used to drink. They prepared their dough (for baking) and filled their water skins from it (the water from the wells). Muhammad ordered them to empty the water skins and give the prepared dough to the camels. Then he went away with them until they stopped at the well from which the she-camel (of Salih) used to drink. He warned them against entering upon the people that had been punished, saying "Do not enter the house of those who were unjust to themselves, unless (you enter) weeping, lest you should suffer the same punishment as was inflicted upon them."

Narrated Jabir ibn Abd-Allah: Muadh ibn Jabal used to pray with the Prophet and then go to lead his people in prayer. Once he led the people in prayer and recited Al-Baqara. A man left (the row of the praying people) and offered (light) prayer (separately) and went away. When Mu'adh came to kNow about it, he said. "He (that man) is a hypocrite." Later that man heard what Mu'adh said about him, so he came to the Prophet and said, "O Allah's Apostle! We are people who work with our own hands and irrigate (our farms) with our camels. Last night Mu'adh led us in the (night) prayer and he recited Sura-al-Baqara, so I offered my prayer separately, and because of that, he accused me of being a hypocrite." The Prophet called Mu'adh and said thrice, "O Mu'adh! You are putting the people to trials? Recite 'Wash-shamsi wad-uhaha' (91) or'Sabbih isma Rabbi ka-l-A'la' (87) or the like." (Book #73, Hadith #127)

Narrated Jabir ibn Abd-Allah: Once a man was driving two Nadihas (camels used for agricultural purposes) and night had fallen. He found Mu'adh praying so he made his camel kneel and joined Mu'adh in the prayer. the latter recited Surat 'AlBaqara" or Surat "An-Nisa", (so) the man left the prayer and went away. When he came to know that Mu'adh had criticized him, he went to the Prophet, and complained against Mu'adh. the Prophet said thrice, "O Mu'adh ! Are you putting the people to trial?" It would have been better if you had recited "Sabbih Isma Rabbika-l-a-la (87)", Wash-Shamsi wadu-haha (91)", or "Wal-laili Idha yaghsha (92)", for the old, the weak and the needy pray behind you." Jabir said that Mu'adh recited Sura Al-Baqara in the 'Isha' prayer. (Volume 1, Book 11(Call to Prayer), Number 673)

See also 
 Ancient towns in Saudi Arabia
 Atlantis of the Sands
 Biblical narratives and the Qur'an
 Legends and the Qur'an
 Meccan sura
 Prophets of Islam
 Shamash
 She-Camel of God
 Stories of The Prophets
 Thamud

Notes

References
 Sahih al-Bukhari Volume 1, Book 11(Call to Prayer), Number 673
 Sahih al-Bukhari Volume 4, Book 55-Prophets, Number 562
 Sahih al-Bukhari Volume 4, Book 55-Prophets, Number 563
 Sahih al-Bukhari Volume 8, Book 73(Good Manners), Number 127
 Sale, G., A Comprehensive Commentary on the Quran, (1896)
 The uretch. Kidár Ibn Salíf. See chaps. vii. 78, and liv. 29, notes.
 Al-Bukhari, Fath al-Bayaan fi Maqaasi al-Quraan. Beirut; al-Maktabah al-Ariyyah (1992)
 John Macdonald, Joseph in the Quran and Muslim Commentary. II. Part II: The Muslim World Vol. 46, No. 3 (1956), pp. 207–224
 Muhammad Farooq-i-Azam Malik (translator), Al-Qur'an, the Guidance for Mankind - English with Arabic Text (Hardcover) 
 William Muir, The Corân: Its Composition and Teaching; and the Testimony it Bears to the Holy Scriptures (London: Soc. for Promoting Christian Knowledge, 1920).
 Exordium to Coherence in the Qur'an. An English Translation of Muqaddamah Nizạ̄m al-Qur'an. Translated by Tariq Mahmood Hashmi. by Hamiduddin Farahi Page 73.
 Milstein, Rachel, Karin Ruhrdanz, and Barbara Schmitz. Stories of the Prophets: Illustrated Manuscripts of Qisas al-Anbiya 1999: vii+261,9 x 12,illus.,plates.(hardcover).
 Gunawan Adnan, Women and The Glorious Qur’ān, Alle Rechte vorbehalten, Universitätsverlag Göttingen (2004) 
 al-Tustari, Sahl ibn 'Abd Allah; Meri, Yousef (editor), Keeler, Annabel and Keeler, Ali (translators) (Dec. 2009). Tafsir Al-Tustari: Great Commentaries of the Holy Qur'an. Fons Vitae. .

Recent translations

Traditional Quranic commentaries (tafsir)

Al-Tabari, Jami' al-bayan 'an ta'wil al-Qur'an, Cairo 1955–69, transl. J. Cooper (ed.), The Commentary on the Qur'an, Oxford University Press, 1987.

Word-for-word analysis
Quranic Arabic Corpus, shows syntax and morphology for each word.
Word for Word English Translation – alquranic.com

External links 

Quran 91 Clear Quran translation

 Surah Ash-Shams (Complete text in Arabic with English and French translations)
Audio – Tafsir and commentary of Surah Shams Part 1 of 2 by Nouman Ali Khan
Audio – Tafsir and commentary of Surah Shams Part 2 of 2 by Nouman Ali Khan
Ash-Shams at Sacred Texts
The story of the Prophet Saleh
Surah ash-Shams  at Bayyinah Tafsir website
Photos of Thamud dwellings at Madain Saleh, Saudi Arabia
prophets (a.s.) - when & where: While this page presents some non-accurate information, including the dates and revealed books, the majority of information regarding the prophets is correct
Sayyid Abul Ala Maududi, Tafhim al-Qur'an. Lahore: Islamic Publications, Ltd. (1981).
Sayid Qutb, Fi Dhilāl al-Qurān. Beirut: Dar al-Shurruq (1981).

Shams
Sun in culture